Tomasz Skweres (born 3 April 1984 in Warsaw) is a Polish composer who lives and works in Vienna.

Biography

Tomasz Skweres was born in Warsaw, Poland. In 1997 he moved to Austria, where he studied composition at the University of Music and Performing Arts, Vienna with Chaya Czernowin and Detlev Müller-Siemens. Skweres also studied cello with Valentin Erben at the same university.

He composed a number of chamber music works, orchestral compositions and works for choir. His music has been performed at Wiener Musikverein, Konzerthaus in Vienna, Gasteig in Munich, Trafo House of Contemporary Arts in Budapest, Lviv Philharmony (Ukraine), Cantacuzino palace in Bukarest (Meridian Festival), Teatro Universitario de la BUAP in Puebla (Mexico), Guangzhou Concert Hall (China), Teatro da Reitoria in Curiciba (Bienal Música Hoje (Brasil)), Nørre Vosborg Chamber Music Festival (Denmark) as well as in Japan, Taiwan, Argentina and Australia. His works has been broadcast by Bayerischer Rundfunk (Germany), ABC Classic FM (Australia), Frequencia Universitaria (Mexico), Ö1 (Austrian state broadcasting station), Radio Stephansdom (Austria) and recorded for Genuin classics, Orlando records a.o.

Since 2012 Tomasz Skweres has been Principal Cellist in the Philharmonic Orchestra Regensburg in Germany and since 2020 cellist of the ensemble for contemporary music Risonanze Erranti in Munich. He is an active interpreter in the field of contemporary music. As a soloist, chamber musician and guest of such ensembles like  Collegium Novum in Zurich, ÖENM (Austrian Ensemble for New Music) in Salzburg, Ensemble Reconsil and Platypus Ensemble Vienna he performs modern music in renowned concert halls all over the world. Tomasz Skweres gives solo recitals with contemporary cello pieces in such renowned international festivals as Warsaw Autumn or Meridian Festival in Bucharest. Many contemporary composers composed and dedicated solo pieces to him.
2016-2017 he was lecturer for cello at the Musik University in Detmold (Hochschule für Musik Detmold) and 2015 at the HfKM Regensburg – College of Catholic Church Music & Musical Education in Regensburg.

Works by Tomasz Skweres are published by Sikorski Music Publishers in Hamburg and Doblinger Publisher in Vienna and were broadcast in different countries (Austria, Germany, Italy, Poland, Australia, Mexico, Cuba) and recorded by professional labels as Genuine, Hänssler Classic, Col legno, Orlando Records.

Commissions 
Tomasz Skweres was commissioned to compose orchestral works for the Vienna Radio Symphony Orchestra, Wiener Konzerthaus, the Orchestra of Theater Regensburg, Biennale Bern (Stadttheater Bern) and chamber music works for the Festival Wien Modern, the International Society for Contemporary Music, ÖGZM (Austrian Society for contemporary Music), the Apollon Musagete Quartet, Reconsil Ensemble, Ensemble Wiener Collage a.o. In the last years the compositions for orchestra, especially for symphonic orchestra play the most important role in the artistic development of Tomasz Skweres - he wrote pieces commissioned by Radio Symphony Orchestra Vienna, Konzerthaus in Vienna, Philhamonic Orchestra Regensburg (D), Niederbayerische Philharmonie(D), Leopoldinum Orchestra (PL) and Hastings Philharmonic (GB). He received also commissions by renowned ensembles such as Apollon Musagete Quartet (PL), Contemporary Music Orchestra (PL), Ensemble Zeitfluss (A), Ensemble Wiener Collage (A) and others. Works by Tomasz Skweres are regularly performed by famous important festivals all over the world, such as Wien Modern (Vienna), Warsaw Autumn, Musica Polonica Nova (Wrocław), Biennial Bern, ISCM World Music Days 2016 in Korea/Tongyeong International Music Festival, Festival Musica 2015 in Strasbourg (France),Festival Klangspuren in Tirol (Austria), Festival Goslar Harz (Germany), Leo Festival (Wrocław) and many others.

Works

Works for orchestra 
 Konzert for cello and orchestra, 2020
 Haymatloz for symphonic orchestra, 2019
 Plutonion for symphonic orchestra, 2018
 Concertino for string orchestra, 2018
 Anakalypteria for female voice for symphonic orchestra, 2016
 über das farbige Licht der Doppelsterne... for symphonic orchestra, 2015
 Critical Mass for symphonic orchestra, 2013
 Notturno for cello and orchestra, 2011

chamber operas 
 Desiderium for two sopranos, zwei actors and small Ensemble, libretto by Maria Skweres, 2018
 Am Anfang starb ein Rabe – for speaking voice, baritone and ensemble, libretto by Levin Westermann, 2010

Works for Ensemble 
 Leyak for Baritonsaxophon, 2 cellos and 4 percussionists, 2021
 Topielica for Englischhorn solo und Ensemble, 2019
 Event Horizon for 15 Instruments, 2019
 von Schwelle zu Schwelle for 13 instruments, 2015
 Tituba for 8 instrument, 2013

Works With Voice 
 Denuo for soprano and large ensemble, 2021
 Four Poems by Rainer Maria Rilke for Sopran and six instruments, 2020
 Firmamente, for soprano, violon cello, poems by Brigitte Stanek, 2020
 contra venenosos vermes for cello solo and vocal ensemble, 2019
 w poszukiwaniu Rzeczydźwięku for soprano and cello, 2019
 Rovanemi for soprano and cello, poem by Brigitte Stanek, 2017
 in fremder fremde for mezzo-soprano and piano, poem by Semier Insayif, 2016
 mori no sakana for soprana, bass clarinet and cello, poem by Erika Kimura, 2014
 Die Geometrie des Himmels ist unerhört, poems by Semier Insayif for speaking voice and small ensemble, 2014
 Sakubel Osil for soprano, flute, clarinet, violin and cello, 2008/new version 2014
 Direkt für soprano, flute and cello, 2007
 Psalm 13 for tenor, flute and cello, 2006
 Gebet for soprano and cello, poem by Małgorzata Hillar, 2005

Chamber music
 Paysage Intime for cello and piano, 2022
 Aquarelle 594KV, miniature for flute, clarinet, vibraphone, violin and cello, 2021
 Erdschatten for baroque flute and harpsichord, 2021
 Nyos for violin und cello, 2021
 Plague for 8 cellos, 2020
 Piwosznik for bass clarinet und cello, 2019
 Heavy Gravity for 2 violins, 2019
 Synapsen, four miniature for historical instruments, recorder, baroque trombone and viol, 2018
 Katakomben for violin, cello and organ, 2018
 Anekdote über Stravinsky, miniature for violin and piano, 2018
 Coffin Ship for cello and accordion, 2018
 Coffin Ship for soprano saxophone and accordion, 2018
 sieben Affekte for violin and Cello, 2017
 Maledictio for recorder, flute, harp and cembalo, 2017
 Grenzgänge for piano quartett, 2016
 Journay into the Subconscious for flute, cello and piano, 2014
 Elusive Thoughts for violin, viola and cello, 2014
 Memory Illussions for violin and harp, 2014
 Penrose Square for saxophone quartet, 2014
 5 Miniaturen for saxophone, clarinet, accordion and double bass, 2013
 Hesitation for cello and piano, 2012
 Spannungsfelder for cello und double bass, 2012
 5 Elemente for guitar and piano, 2010
 Autismus for flute and cembalo, 2010
 Axon for flute and clarinet, 2010
 Asteria-Ortygia-Delos for string quartet, 2009
 Wasser for piano trio, 2008
 1st string quartet, 2006

Works for Solo Instruments 
 Enigmatic Pathways for viola solo, 2022
 Suite Macabre for cello solo, 2021
 Sport ist Mord for double bass solo, 2020
 Impact for violin solo, 2016
 drei Gedanken for clarinet solo, 2016
 Guillotine for cello solo, 2016
 Guillotine for double bass solo, 2016
 Short Story for guitar solo, 2013
 Reminiszenz for violine solo 2013
 Deuterium for violin solo 2012
 Double-headed for horn solo 2012
 Transformations for cello solo, 2011
 Verse for cello solo, 2009

Awards and Scholarships 

 2021 1st prize Earplay Donald Aird International Composers Competition, USA
 2021 1st prize Gilgamesh International composition competition, USA
 2021 state scholarship for composition of the Austrian ministry for culture and education
 2020 1st prize 1st Chalki international composition competition, Greece
 2019 2nd prize Zemlinsky Prize 2019
 2018 2nd prize 20th International Chopin & Friends Festival "New Vision" composition competition
 2017 1st prize TONALi composition competition
 2016 spezial prize international composition competition Citta' di Udine
 2015 promotional award of the city of Vienna
 2014 state scholarship for composition of the Austrian ministry for culture and education
 2014 1st prize Ernst Krenek composition competition 
 2010 start scholarship of the Austrian ministry for culture and education
 2009 1st prize composition competition for the obligatory work for the international Joseph Haydn chamber music competition, Vienna 
 2009 Theodor-Körner-Preis in composition
 2009 2nd prize international composition competition of the Deutsche Hochdruckliga
 2009 composition scholarship of the Czibulka-Stiftung
 2008 composition scholarship of the Swiss Thyll-Dürr-Stiftung
 2008 2nd prize international Franz Josef Reinl composition competition
 2006 1st prize composition competition for the obligatory work for the international Joseph Haydn chamber music competition, Vienna

Discography 
 Coffin Ship for saxophone and accordion, East West, Duo Aliada, Hänssler Classic, 2021
 Contra Venenosos Vermes for cello and mixed choir – Wrocławscy Kameraliści, 2019
 Short Story for guitar solo – Soundscapes III, Genuin classics, 2015 (artist: Rainer Stegmann)
 Tituba for mixed ensemble – Exploring the World Vol. 2, Orlando Records, 2015 (artist: Reconsil Ensemble)
 Asteria-Ortygia-Delos for string quartet – Austrian Young Composers Vol. 3, Österreichischer Komponistenbund and IGNM (artist: Apollon Musagète Quartett)
 Asteria-Ortygia-Delos for string quartet – Contemporanea 2014, Globe Records (artist: Interensemble)

References

External links 
 

Polish composers
1984 births
Polish musicians
Living people
Theodor Körner Prize recipients